High Heeled Blues is a blues album by the American guitarist and singer Rory Block. Produced by John Sebastian and released in 1981 through Rounder Records, it included a number of tracks that took Block back to the classical blues form with which she began her career – including three compositions by Robert Johnson, one by Skip James, and a number first popularized by Bessie Smith ("Down in the Dumps").  Other songs move in a more modern direction, incorporating elements of pop, country, and gospel.

CD Track listing

Personnel 
Rory Block – lead vocals, acoustic guitars, harmonium on "Got to Have You Be My Man"
John Sebastian – harmonica, baritone electric guitar
Robb Goldstein – hammered dulcimer
Warren Bernhardt – piano, harmonium

Production
Rory Block and John Sebastian – production
Shep Siegel – engineering
John Sebastian – liner notes

References

Rory Block albums
1981 albums
Rounder Records albums